Bo Evert Ericson (28 January 1919 – 14 February 1970) was a Swedish hammer thrower who won a gold medal at the 1946 European Athletics Championships in Oslo with a throw of 56.44 metres. He was also a finalist at the 1948 Olympics in London, but he finished in sixth place with a throw of 52.98 metres.

Ericson twice broke the Swedish national record for the hammer throw–in 1941 with a throw of 56.66 metres and, secondly, in 1947 with a throw of 57.19 metres–and held the record outright from 1941 until 1955. He was a ten-time winner of the hammer throw at the Swedish national championships.

References

1919 births
1970 deaths
Athletes from Gothenburg
Swedish male hammer throwers
Olympic athletes of Sweden
Athletes (track and field) at the 1948 Summer Olympics
European Athletics Championships medalists